Mount Emily Park covers 3.1 hectares in Singapore.

The park is located in District 9, next to Istana and close to the areas known as Little India and Bugis. It contains a stand of mature trees, which serve to moderate the climate in nearby areas.

See also
 Mount Emily Reservoir

References

Mount Emily Park at National Parks Board

Places in Singapore
Parks in Singapore
Newton, Singapore